Carlijn Jans (born 24 July 1987 in Breda) is a Dutch female volleyball player. She is a member of the Netherlands women's national volleyball team and played for Alterno Apeldoorn in 2014. She was part of the Dutch national team at the 2014 FIVB Volleyball Women's World Championship in Italy.

Clubs
  Alterno Apeldoorn (2014)

References

External links
 Carlijn Jans at the International Volleyball Federation
 

1987 births
Living people
Dutch women's volleyball players
Sportspeople from Breda